Maribel Arana is a Guatemalan model and beauty pageant contestant who represented Guatemala in Miss World 2008 in South Africa.  She studied telecommunications at the Galileo University.

References

External links
 Miss Guatemala 2008

1985 births
Living people
Miss World 2008 delegates
Miss Guatemala winners
People from Guatemala City